Hardianus Lakudu is an Indonesian basketball player for the Satria Muda Pertamina of the Indonesian Basketball League.

Club career
After winning the 2021 Indonesian Basketball League (IBL) Championship and winning the Most Valuable Player award. Hardianus Lakudu became a restricted free agent in summer 2021. SM Pertamina's management had already started talks about a new contract during the season. The club was ready to offer Hardianus a salary raise. Yet, Hardianus' travels with the Indonesian national team and the death of his father delayed the contract extension talks.

National team career
He has been a member of the Indonesia national team.

Career Statistics

NBL/IBL

Regular season

Playoffs

References

External links
FIBA profile
FIBA Archive profile 
Asia-basket.com profile 
IBL profile

1992 births
Living people
Point guards
Indonesian men's basketball players
Sportspeople from East Kalimantan
Competitors at the 2021 Southeast Asian Games
Southeast Asian Games gold medalists for Indonesia
Southeast Asian Games medalists in basketball